The Rink, a silent film from 1916, was Charlie Chaplin's eighth film for Mutual Films. The film co-starred Edna Purviance, Eric Campbell, Henry Bergman, and Albert Austin, and is best known for showcasing Chaplin's roller skating skills.

Synopsis
Charlie plays an inept and sometimes clumsy waiter at a restaurant. One of his customers is the hot-tempered Mr. Stout. Charlie determines his bill by examining what he has spilled on his suit. While he is not a great server, Charlie is an excellent skater at the nearby roller rink. He meets a girl there and saves her from the unwanted attentions of the same Mr. Stout he earlier encountered at the restaurant. The grateful girl invites Charlie to a skating party. Charlie accepts and attends the party in top hat and tails. He again encounters the volatile Mr. Stout and runs afoul of Mrs. Stout. While skating, Charlie accidentally falls on her and pulls down her skirt. The skating party quickly descends into a riot. The police are called to restore order, but Charlie escapes by deftly rolling away with his cane hooked to the back of a moving automobile.

Chaplin's obvious skill on roller skates surprised many of his fans, but Charlie was an experienced performer. As a touring vaudevillian with Fred Karno's pantomime troupe, Chaplin appeared in a roller-skating skit in which he displayed a talent for comedic falls—and the ability to cause other skaters to topple.

Review
A reviewer from Variety positively wrote, "There is plenty of fun provided by [Chaplin] on the rollers and he displayed a surprising cleverness on them. A number of funny falls occurred as was looked for, with Charlie outshining and outwitting any of the others on the floor."

Cast
 Charles Chaplin - A Waiter. Posing as Sir Cecil Seltzer, C.O.D.
 Edna Purviance - The Girl
 James T. Kelley - Her Father
 Eric Campbell - Mr. Stout, Edna's Admirer
 Henry Bergman - Mrs. Stout and Angry Diner
 Lloyd Bacon - Guest
 Albert Austin - The Cook and Skater
 Frank J. Coleman - Restaurant Manager
 John Rand - Waiter
 Charlotte Mineau - Friend of Edna
 Leota Bryan - Friend of Edna
 Fred Goodwins - Man in the jacket

Sound version
In 1932, Amedee Van Beuren of Van Beuren Studios, purchased Chaplin's Mutual comedies for $10,000 each, added music by Gene Rodemich and Winston Sharples and sound effects, and re-released them through RKO Radio Pictures. Chaplin had no legal recourse to stop the RKO release.

See also
Charlie Chaplin filmography

References

External links

The Rink at Doctor Macro's High Quality Movie Scans

Short films directed by Charlie Chaplin
1916 films
American silent short films
American black-and-white films
1916 comedy films
1916 short films
Roller skating films
Silent American comedy films
Articles containing video clips
American comedy short films
Mutual Film films
1910s American films